Summerfield is an unincorporated community in Marion County, Florida, United States. It is located near the intersection of US 301 and County Road 475A. The community is part of the Ocala Metropolitan Statistical Area.

History

A post office called Summerfield has been in operation since 1885. The community was named for Col. Adam G. Summer, a local cattleman and land owner.

See also

References

External links

 Ocala/Marion County Visitors & Convention Bureau

Unincorporated communities in Marion County, Florida
Unincorporated communities in Florida